Benigno Filomeno de Rojas Ramos (1821 in Santiago de los Caballeros – 1865 in Santo Domingo) was a lawyer and Dominican politician. He served as the Head of State of the Dominican Republic from January 24, 1865 until March 24 of that year, before that, he served as the vice president of that country under President Santana's administration from 1858 to 1861.

He was the president of the Senate of the Dominican Republic in 1854.

References

|-

|-

|-

1821 births
1865 deaths
People from Santiago de los Caballeros
Dominican Republic people of Spanish descent
Presidents of the Dominican Republic
Vice presidents of the Dominican Republic
Presidents of the Senate of the Dominican Republic